Pankaj  Pushkar is an Indian politician and a member of  the Sixth Legislative Assembly of Delhi in India. He represented the Timarpur constituency of Delhi and is a member of the Aam Aadmi Party political party.

Early life and education
Pankaj  Pushkar was born in Gajraula. He attended the Chaudhary Charan Singh University and attained Master of Arts degree.

Political career
Pankaj  Pushkar has been a MLA for one term. He represented the  Timarpur constituency and is a  member of the Aam Aadmi Party political party.

On 1 September 2015, he protested against his own party over their neglecting the demands of the people of his constituency on dengue deaths. Pushkar led a march to the Chief Minister of Delhi, Arvind Kejriwal's residence and protested. Pushkar attempted to meet the Chief Minister and hand over a memorandum but was stopped by the police and was not allowed to meet the Chief Minister. He also accused the government of not being sensitive to backward castes.

On 18 October 2015, Pushkar accused the Delhi government of "suppressing" his voice in the Assembly and said there were "permanent barricades" between the ministers and the public in the capital.

Posts held

See also
Aam Aadmi Party
Delhi Legislative Assembly
Government of India
Politics of India
Sixth Legislative Assembly of Delhi
Timarpur (Delhi Assembly constituency)
Uttar Pradesh Legislative Assembly

References 

1972 births
Aam Aadmi Party politicians from Delhi
Delhi MLAs 2015–2020
Living people
People from Delhi
People from New Delhi